The Statue of Penelope is a marble statue which was discovered in Persepolis and is believed to be a statue of Penelope. 
Normally you can see the statue at National Museum of Iran  However, starting from May 2015  it was on display at Milan's Prada Foundation, Italy for  around 4 months. 
Life-Size Greek lady in the Severe Style was excavated by the Oriental Institute of Chicago in 1945. It lay scattered in three fragments in the ruins of the Persepolis Treasury.

References

Statues
Persepolis
National museums of Iran
1945 archaeological discoveries